Henry Edward Stein (September 22, 1869 – April 1, 1927) was an American catcher in Major League Baseball. He played one game for the St. Louis Cardinals in 1900.

References

External links

1869 births
1927 deaths
Major League Baseball catchers
St. Louis Cardinals players
Baseball players from Missouri
People from Hannibal, Missouri